Gordon Lathlin Memorial Centre is an indoor ice hockey arena located on the Opaskwayak Cree Nation reserve near The Pas, Manitoba, Canada. The 1,100-seat arena was built in 1985, and since 1996 has been home to the OCN Blizzard, who play in the Manitoba Junior Hockey League. During a four-month off-season for hockey each year, the centre is used for social gatherings, concerts, and weddings.

The arena is named after the late Gordon Lathlin, who served as the band's chief from 1967 to 1974.

In 2012 a second hockey tenant began play at the GLMC when OCN Storm joined the Keystone Junior Hockey League.

References

Indoor ice hockey venues in Canada
Indoor arenas in Manitoba
1985 establishments in Manitoba
Sports venues completed in 1985